John J. Hayes (June 27, 1861 – April 25, 1905) was an American Major League Baseball player from Brooklyn, New York, who split most of his playing time between catcher and in center field.

Career
In 1890, he returned to major league baseball when he played for the Brooklyn Ward's Wonders.

Hayes is known for one infamous game on June 17,  when playing for the Brooklyn Grays, he and his teammates resented the arrival of Phenomenal Smith, whose brash demeanor didn't sit well with the veterans on the team, and committed 28 errors en route to an 18–5 loss to the St. Louis Browns, with Hayes committing seven of them. After the game, Charlie Byrne fired manager Charlie Hackett, and handed out heavy fines to the guilty players.

Post-career
Jackie Hayes died at the age of 43 in his hometown of Brooklyn, and is interred at Calvary Cemetery, Woodside, New York.

References

External links

1861 births
1905 deaths
19th-century baseball players
Sportspeople from Brooklyn
Baseball players from New York City
Major League Baseball catchers
Major League Baseball center fielders
Worcester Ruby Legs players
Pittsburgh Alleghenys players
Brooklyn Grays players
Washington Nationals (1886–1889) players
Baltimore Orioles (AA) players
Brooklyn Ward's Wonders players
Brooklyn Atlantics (AA) players
Burials at Calvary Cemetery (Queens)
Hartford Dark Blues (minor league) players
Nashville Blues players
Birmingham Ironmakers players
Scranton Miners players
Newark Little Giants players
Oakland Colonels players
Sacramento Altas players
San Francisco Haverlys players
Spokane Bunchgrassers players